Abolfazl Ghana'ati is an Iranian conservative politician and former military officer who currently serves as a member of the City Council of Tehran.

He was listed by Progress and Justice Population of Islamic Iran and Front of Islamic Revolution Stability in 2013 election.

References
 Biography 

1966 births
Living people
Alliance of Builders of Islamic Iran politicians
Islamic Revolutionary Guard Corps personnel of the Iran–Iraq War
Tehran Councillors 2013–2017